Ashraf Ali Khan Chowdhury (1878 – 8 December 1941) was a Bengali lawyer and politician.

Early life
Chowdhury was born in 1878 at Natore District, Bengal Presidency, British India. His father was Khan Bahadur Ershad Ali Khan Chowdhury, member of Bengal Legislative Council, and his mother was Masirunnesa Khanam. He studied law in England and became a Barrister in 1912.

Career
Chowdhury started his legal career by joining the Calcutta High Court bar. He was introduced to politics by his father and developed a political career under the patronage of Syed Nawab Ali Chowdhury. He helped the founding of East Bengal and Assam Provincial Muslim Educational Society. He was a founding Member of All India Muslim League. In 1928, he was elected to the Bengal Legislative Council from Natore District. In 1932 he was offered a judgeship at the Calcutta High Court which he declined as he preferred a career in politics over law. In 1937, he was re-elected to the Bengal Legislative Assembly from Natore District as a candidate of All India Muslim League. He served as the Deputy Speaker of the Bengal Legislative Assembly.

Death
Chowdhury died on 8 December 1941 in Kolkata, West Bengal, British India.

References

1878 births
1941 deaths
People from Natore District
Bengali lawyers
All India Muslim League members
Lawyers in British India